Olefine Louise Margarethe Moe (18 March 1850 – 8 November 1933) was a Norwegian opera singer, actress, opera director and singing teacher.

Biography
She was born in Bergen, Norway. 
She was the daughter of Iver Christian Moe  and Inger Marie Amundsen.
She was married in 1877 to Swedish pianist Oscar Fridolf Torssell (1844–1880). Their daughters   Margit  Torsell  (1878-1968) and
Astri Torssell (1879-1951) were also actors.
Margit was married to Swedish pentathlete  William Grut (1914–2012).
Astri  was married to Norwegian architect Christian von Munthe (1880-1967).

She debuted as a dramatic actress on the Christiania Theatre in Christiania in 1868. After having participated in some opera performances stage by travelling Italian opera troupes, she became the student of Fredrika Stenhammar in Stockholm, where she debuted as an opera singer on the Royal Swedish Opera in 1872. She was contracted at the opera in 1873–81. In 1882–1886, she ran the first opera in Norway at Christiania Tivoli in Oslo with the Swedish writer Mattis Lundström, where she played the leading roles. 
She made guest performances in Stockholm and Oslo until 1896. Until 1917, she was active as a singing teacher. She moved to Sweden in 1904 
where her daughters, Astri and Margit, worked as actors.
She died  at Ås and was buried at Vår Frelsers gravlund in Oslo.

References

Other sources
	Olefine Europas konstnärer  

1850 births
1933 deaths
Actors from Bergen
19th-century Norwegian actresses
Norwegian expatriates in Sweden
19th-century Norwegian women opera singers
Norwegian opera directors
Musicians from Bergen
Norwegian music educators
Women music educators
Burials at the Cemetery of Our Saviour